Streblus sclerophyllus is a species of plant in the family Moraceae. It is endemic to New Caledonia.

References

sclerophyllus
Endemic flora of New Caledonia
Vulnerable plants
Taxonomy articles created by Polbot
Taxa named by E. J. H. Corner